Yuri "Aggro" Santos (born 12 October 1989) is a Brazilian rapper who lives in Balham, London.

Career

Santos was discovered by ChannelAka, a music channel, after his song "Free Yard" was featured on the network. He was then signed to Future Records in 2010, and released his second mixtape, Rhythm N Flow. In 2010, he was nominated for an award at the Urban Music Awards.

Santos released his debut single "Candy", which features Kimberly Wyatt, on 2 May 2010, which was later certified silver by the BPI. His second single, "Saint or Sinner", was released on 22 August 2010 and his third, "Like U Like", (featuring Kimberley Walsh), was released on 14 January 2011. Santos's debut album, titled AggroSantos.com was released on 31 January 2011.

I'm a Celebrity...Get Me Out of Here!
In 2010, Santos participated in the tenth series of I'm a Celebrity...Get Me Out of Here! and was voted off the show on day 19, finishing in fifth place overall.

2013–2014: FOD Records
In 2013, Santos signed to FOD Records. In 2014, he began writing for upcoming music. On 23 March 2014, he released the video for "Selfie Selfie Selfie".

Personal life

Santos was born on 12 October 1989. He studied at Salesian College in Battersea, London, and went on to study at the BRIT School.

On 9 September 2011, it was reported that Santos had been accused of rape by a fan who returned with the rapper to his hotel room following two gigs. The first rape had allegedly taken place on 25 or 26 September 2010. The second attack allegedly took place on 7 May 2011 in Chichester, West Sussex. Santos and another man, 21-year-old Tyrelle Ritchie, were both charged to appear in court on the same date at Chichester Magistrates' Court on 19 September 2011.

On 3 May 2013, a jury of eight women and four men, found Santos not guilty of both accusations unanimously, and acquitted him in under two hours of deliberation. He has since called for rape suspects to remain anonymous until found guilty, as he felt the trial had "tarnished" his reputation for a short while, even though he was innocent.

Discography

Studio albums
 AggroSantos.com (2011)

Mixtapes
 Aggro Culture (2009)
 The Rhythm N Flow (2010)
 The Stamina (2010)

Singles

Music videos

References

External links

1988 births
Living people
Brazilian emigrants to England
21st-century Brazilian male singers
21st-century Brazilian singers
Brazilian rappers
I'm a Celebrity...Get Me Out of Here! (British TV series) participants
People acquitted of rape
People educated at the BRIT School
People from Balham
Rappers from London
Singers from São Paulo